Sandeep Byala (born 22 November 1967) is an Indian judoka. He competed in the men's half-lightweight event at the 1992 Summer Olympics.

References

1967 births
Living people
Indian male judoka
Olympic judoka of India
Judoka at the 1992 Summer Olympics
Sportspeople from Amritsar
Judoka at the 1986 Asian Games
Judoka at the 1994 Asian Games
Asian Games medalists in judo
Asian Games bronze medalists for India
Medalists at the 1986 Asian Games
Recipients of the Arjuna Award
20th-century Indian people